The Eastern League Manager of the Year Award is an annual award given to the best manager in Minor League Baseball's Eastern League based on their regular-season performance as voted on by league managers. Broadcasters, Minor League Baseball executives, and members of the media have previously voted as well. Though the league was established in 1938, the award was not created until 1962. After the cancellation of the 2020 season, the league was known as the Double-A Northeast in 2021 before reverting to the Eastern League name in 2022.

Four managers have won the award twice: Bill Dancy, Brad Komminsk, Matt Walbeck, and Dusty Wathan. Wathan won the award in consecutive years (2015 and 2016).

Eight managers from the Reading Fightin Phils have been selected for the Manager of the Year Award, more than any other team in the league, followed by the Akron RubberDucks (5); the Harrisburg Senators (4); the Albany-Colonie Yankees, Binghamton Rumble Ponies, New Hampshire Fisher Cats, Trenton Thunder, and West Haven Yankees (3); the Bowie Baysox, Elmira Pioneers, Glens Falls Tigers, Pittsfield Red Sox, Portland Sea Dogs, and Trois-Rivières Aigles (2); and the Altoona Curve, Binghamton Triplets, Bristol Red Sox, Charleston Indians, Erie SeaWolves, Holyoke Millers, London Tigers, Lynn Sailors, New Britain Rock Cats, New Haven Ravens, Québec Carnavals, Somerset Patriots, Vermont Mariners, Waterbury Giants, Waterbury Pirates, Williamsport Grays, and York Pirates (1).

Nine managers from the New York Yankees and Philadelphia Phillies Major League Baseball (MLB) organizations have won the award, more than any others, followed the Cleveland Guardians organization (6); the Boston Red Sox organization (5); the Baltimore Orioles, Pittsburgh Pirates, Toronto Blue Jays, and Washington Nationals organizations (4); the Detroit Tigers and New York Mets organizations (3); the Cincinnati Reds and Seattle Mariners organizations (2); and the Chicago White Sox, Miami Marlins, Milwaukee Brewers, Minnesota Twins, Oakland Athletics, and San Francisco Giants organizations (1).

Winners

Wins by team

Active Eastern League teams appear in bold.

Wins by organization

Active Eastern League–Major League Baseball affiliations appear in bold.

Notes

References
Specific

General

Awards established in 1962
Minor league baseball coaching awards
Manager